Count Gustaf Adolf Levenhaupt (aka Löwenhaupt; 1619–1656) was a Swedish soldier and statesman.

He was appointed Major General in 1645, Privy Councilor in 1650, General in 1651, Field Marshal, in 1655 and Governor General of Riga, in 1656.  In the Thirty Years' War (1618–1648) he commanded troops at the Battle of Breitenfeld (First Battle of Leipzig), in 1642.

Queen Christina of Sweden promised him the Himmelpforten Convent with all its revenues, and on 30 July/ 9 August 1651O.S./N.S. he was invested with the convent as a fief heritable in the male line (Mannlehen). In the course of the Great Reduction of 1680 in the following year the general government of Swedish Bremen-Verden revoked the enfeoffment to the Lewenhaupt/Löwenhaupt counts, so that Lewenhaupt's son Gustaf Mauritz (1651–1700) lost Himmelpforten again to the Swedish crown.

References

1619 births
1656 deaths
Field marshals of Sweden
Governors-General of Sweden
Members of the Privy Council of Sweden
Swedish people of German descent
Swedish counts
17th-century Swedish politicians
17th-century Swedish military personnel